Straight, No Chaser is the sixth studio album Thelonious Monk recorded for Columbia records, released in 1967. The album was reissued on CD in 1996, including restored versions of previously abridged performances and three additional tracks.

Track listing
All song by Thelonious Monk unless otherwise noted

Side One
 "Locomotive" – 6:38
 "I Didn't Know About You" (Ellington) – 6:50
 "Straight, No Chaser" – 10:31

Side Two
 "Japanese Folk Song" (R. Taki)* – 11:03
 "Between the Devil and the Deep Blue Sea" (Arlen, Koehler) – 7:34
 "We See" – 8:48

On the original LP, the song "Kōjō no Tsuki" by Rentarō Taki was incorrectly identified as a "Japanese folk song" of unknown provenance. This has been corrected on re-issues of the album.

CD Re-issue

"Locomotive" – 6:40
"I Didn't Know About You" (Duke Ellington) – 6:52
"Straight, No Chaser" – 11:28
"Japanese Folk Song (Kōjō no Tsuki)" (Rentarō Taki) – 16:42
"Between the Devil and the Deep Blue Sea" (Harold Arlen) – 7:36
"We See" – 11:37
"This Is My Story, This Is My Song" (Phoebe Knapp) – 1:42 (better known by the title "Blessed Assurance")
"I Didn't Know About You" (D. Ellington) – 6:49
"Green Chimneys" (Th. Monk) – 6:34

Personnel
 Thelonious Monk – piano
 Charlie Rouse – tenor sax
 Larry Gales – bass
 Ben Riley – drums

References

1967 albums
Thelonious Monk albums
Albums produced by Teo Macero
Columbia Records albums